Frances "Fran" Bagenal (born 1954) is a Professor of Astrophysical and Planetary Sciences at the University of Colorado Boulder and a researcher in the fields of space plasmas and planetary magnetospheres.

Career
Bagenal has worked on a number of planetary science missions including the Voyager Plasma Science (PLS) experiment, Galileo, Deep Space 1, New Horizons mission to Pluto, and the Juno mission to Jupiter. Usually in her work on different missions, she is a member of the science team as a plasma scientist. Bagenal chaired NASA's Outer Planet Assessment Group that provides input from the scientific community on exploration of the outer Solar System.
She appeared in The Farthest, a 2017 documentary on the Voyager program, and in multiple television documentaries including the NOVA 2019 miniseries The Planets.

Honors
 Elected a Fellow of the American Geophysical Union in 2006.
 Elected a Legacy Fellow of the American Astronomical Society in 2020 
 Elected to the National Academy of Sciences in 2021 
 The outer main-belt asteroid 10020 Bagenal, discovered by astronomer Schelte J. Bus at Palomar Observatory in 1979, was named in her honor. The official naming citation was published on 13 April 2017.

Selected publications

References

External links
NASA Interview with Fran Bagenal about New Horizons
Astrobiology Magazine, October 17, 2013, “From Plasma Science to Dwarf Planets: Fran Bagenal”
Women in Planetary Science interview with Bagenal

1954 births
Living people
People from Dorchester, Dorset
Massachusetts Institute of Technology School of Science alumni
NASA people
Fellows of the American Geophysical Union
Planetary scientists
Women planetary scientists
Fellows of the American Astronomical Society
Members of the United States National Academy of Sciences